St. Paul's is a Catholic church at Gunupur, Odisha, India. It is one of the oldest Catholic churches of the district. The church is located at 19°4'55"N,  83°48'44"E in Gunupur.

History 
Established in 1961, the church celebrated its golden jubilee in 2011.

Activity 
Under the social-welfare scheme, a boys' hostel is managed at Gunupur by the church.

See also

References

External links 
 GCatholic.org
 Catholic Hierarchy

1961 establishments in Orissa
Christianity in Odisha
Rayagada district
Roman Catholic churches completed in 1961
Roman Catholic churches in India
Churches in Odisha
20th-century Roman Catholic church buildings in India